Kaupas is a surname. Notable people with the surname include:

 Maria Kaupas (1880–1940), American religious sister
 Natas Kaupas (born 1969), American skateboarder
 Vytautas Kaupas (born 1982), Lithuanian cyclist